Antoninus Pius (Latin: Titus Aelius Hadrianus Antoninus Pius; 19 September 86 – 7 March 161) was Roman emperor from 138 to 161. He was the fourth of the Five Good Emperors from the Nerva–Antonine dynasty.

Born into a senatorial family, Antoninus held various offices during the reign of Emperor Hadrian. He married Hadrian's niece Faustina, and Hadrian adopted him as his son and successor shortly before his death. Antoninus acquired the cognomen Pius after his accession to the throne, either because he compelled the Senate to deify his adoptive father, or because he had saved senators sentenced to death by Hadrian in his later years. His reign is notable for the peaceful state of the Empire, with no major revolts or military incursions during this time. A successful military campaign in southern Scotland early in his reign resulted in the construction of the Antonine Wall.

Antoninus was an effective administrator, leaving his successors a large surplus in the treasury, expanding free access to drinking water throughout the Empire, encouraging legal conformity, and facilitating the enfranchisement of freed slaves. He died of illness in 161 and was succeeded by his adopted sons Marcus Aurelius and Lucius Verus as co-emperors.

Early life

Childhood and family
Antoninus Pius was born Titus Aurelius Fulvus Boionius Antoninus near Lanuvium (modern-day Lanuvio) in Italy to Titus Aurelius Fulvus, consul in 86, and wife Arria Fadilla The Aurelii Fulvi were an Aurelian family settled in Nemausus (modern Nîmes). Titus Aurelius Fulvus was the son of a senator of the same name, who, as legate of Legio III Gallica, had supported Vespasian in his bid to the Imperial office and been rewarded with a suffect consulship, plus an ordinary one under Domitian in 85. The Aurelii Fulvi were therefore a relatively new senatorial family from Gallia Narbonensis whose rise to prominence was supported by the Flavians. The link between Antoninus' family and their home province explains the increasing importance of the post of proconsul of Gallia Narbonensis during the late second century.

Antoninus' father had no other children and died shortly after his 89 ordinary consulship. Antoninus was raised by his maternal grandfather Gnaeus Arrius Antoninus, reputed by contemporaries to be a man of integrity and culture and a friend of Pliny the Younger. The Arrii Antonini were an older senatorial family from Italy, very influential during Nerva's reign. Arria Fadilla, Antoninus' mother, married afterwards Publius Julius Lupus, suffect consul in 98; from that marriage came two daughters, Arria Lupula and Julia Fadilla.

Marriage and children
Some time between 110 and 115, Antoninus married Annia Galeria Faustina the Elder. They are believed to have enjoyed a happy marriage. Faustina was the daughter of consul Marcus Annius Verus (II) and Rupilia Faustina (a step-sister to the Empress Vibia Sabina). Faustina was a beautiful woman, and despite rumours about her character, it is clear that Antoninus cared for her deeply.

Faustina bore Antoninus four children, two sons and two daughters. They were:
 Marcus Aurelius Fulvus Antoninus (died before 138); his sepulchral inscription has been found at the Mausoleum of Hadrian in Rome.
 Marcus Galerius Aurelius Antoninus (died before 138); his sepulchral inscription has been found at the Mausoleum of Hadrian in Rome. His name appears on a Greek Imperial coin.
 Aurelia Fadilla (died in 135); she married Lucius Plautius Lamia Silvanus, consul 145. She appeared to have no children with her husband; and her sepulchral inscription has been found in Italy.
 Annia Galeria Faustina Minor or Faustina the Younger (between 125 and 130–175), a future Roman Empress, married her maternal cousin Marcus Aurelius in 146.

When Faustina died in 141, Antoninus was greatly distressed. In honour of her memory, he asked the Senate to deify her as a goddess, and authorised the construction of a temple to be built in the Roman Forum in her name, with priestesses serving in her temple. He had various coins with her portrait struck in her honor. These coins were scripted "DIVA FAUSTINA" and were elaborately decorated. He further founded a charity, calling it Puellae Faustinianae or Girls of Faustina, which assisted destitute girls of good family. Finally, Antoninus created a new alimenta, a Roman welfare program, as part of Cura Annonae.

The emperor never remarried. Instead, he lived with Galeria Lysistrate, one of Faustina's freed women. Concubinage was a form of female companionship sometimes chosen by powerful men in Ancient Rome, especially widowers like Vespasian, and Marcus Aurelius. Their union could not produce any legitimate offspring who could threaten any heirs, such as those of Antoninus. Also, as one could not have a wife and an official concubine (or two concubines) at the same time, Antoninus avoided being pressed into a marriage with a noblewoman from another family. (Later, Marcus Aurelius would also reject the advances of his former fiancée Ceionia Fabia, Lucius Verus's sister, on the grounds of protecting his children from a stepmother, and took a concubine instead.)

Favour with Hadrian 

Having filled the offices of quaestor and praetor with more than usual success, he obtained the consulship in 120 having as his colleague Lucius Catilius Severus. He was next appointed by the Emperor Hadrian as one of the four proconsuls to administer Italia, his district including Etruria, where he had estates. He then greatly increased his reputation by his conduct as proconsul of Asia, probably during 134–135.

He acquired much favor with Hadrian, who adopted him as his son and successor on 25 February 138, after the death of his first adopted son Lucius Aelius, on the condition that Antoninus would in turn adopt Marcus Annius Verus, the son of his wife's brother, and Lucius, son of Lucius Aelius, who afterwards became the emperors Marcus Aurelius and Lucius Verus. He also adopted (briefly) the name Imperator Titus Aelius Caesar Antoninus, in preparation for his rule. There seems to have been some opposition to Antoninus' appointment on the part of other potential claimants, among them his former consular colleague Lucius Catilius Severus, then prefect of the city. Nevertheless, Antoninus assumed power without opposition.

Emperor

On his accession, Antoninus' name and style became Imperator Caesar Titus Aelius Hadrianus Antoninus Augustus Pontifex Maximus. One of his first acts as Emperor was to persuade the Senate to grant divine honours to Hadrian, which they had at first refused; his efforts to persuade the Senate to grant these honours is the most likely reason given for his title of Pius (dutiful in affection; compare pietas).  Two other reasons for this title are that he would support his aged father-in-law with his hand at Senate meetings, and that he had saved those men that Hadrian, during his period of ill-health, had condemned to death.

Immediately after Hadrian's death, Antoninus approached Marcus and requested that his marriage arrangements be amended: Marcus' betrothal to Ceionia Fabia would be annulled, and he would be betrothed to Faustina, Antoninus' daughter, instead. Faustina's betrothal to Ceionia's brother Lucius Commodus would also have to be annulled. Marcus consented to Antoninus' proposal.

Antoninus built temples, theaters, and mausoleums, promoted the arts and sciences, and bestowed honours and financial rewards upon the teachers of rhetoric and philosophy. Antoninus made few initial changes when he became emperor, leaving intact as far as possible the arrangements instituted by Hadrian. Epigraphical and prosopographical research has revealed that Antoninus' imperial ruling team centered around a group of closely knit senatorial families, most of them members of the priestly congregation for the cult of Hadrian, the sodales Hadrianales. According to the German historian H.G. Pflaum, prosopographical research of Antoninus' ruling team allows us to grasp the deeply conservative character of the ruling senatorial caste.

Lack of warfare 

There are no records of any military related acts in his time in which he participated. One modern scholar has written "It is almost certain not only that at no time in his life did he ever see, let alone command, a Roman army, but that, throughout the twenty-three years of his reign, he never went within five hundred miles of a legion."

His reign was the most peaceful in the entire history of the Principate, notwithstanding the fact that there were several military disturbances in the Empire in his time. Such disturbances happened in Mauretania, where a senator was named as governor of Mauretania Tingitana in place of the usual equestrian procurator and cavalry reinforcements from Pannonia were brought in, towns such as Sala and Tipasa being fortified. Similar disturbances took place in Judea, and amongst the Brigantes in Britannia; however, these were considered less serious than prior (and later) revolts among both. It was however in Britain that Antoninus decided to follow a new, more aggressive path, with the appointment of a new governor in 139, Quintus Lollius Urbicus, a native of Numidia and previously governor of Germania Inferior as well as a new man.

Under instructions from the emperor, Lollius undertook an invasion of southern Scotland, winning some significant victories, and constructing the Antonine Wall from the Firth of Forth to the Firth of Clyde. The wall, however, was soon gradually decommissioned during the mid-150s and eventually abandoned late during the reign (early 160s), for reasons that are still not quite clear. Antonine's Wall is mentioned in just one literary source, Antoninus' biography in the Historia Augusta. Pausanias makes a brief and confused mention of a war in Britain. In one inscription honoring Antoninus, erected by Legio II Augusta, which participated in the building of the Wall, a relief showing four naked prisoners, one of them beheaded, seems to stand for some actual warfare.

Although Antonine's Wall was, in principle, much shorter (37 miles in length as opposed to 73), and at first sight more defensible than Hadrian's Wall, the additional area that it enclosed within the Empire was barren, with land use for grazing already in decay. This meant that supply lines to the wall were strained enough such as the costs for maintaining the additional territory outweighed the benefits of doing so. Also, in the absence of urban development and the ensuing Romanization process, the rear of the wall could not be lastingly pacified.

It has been therefore speculated that the invasion of Lowland Scotland and the building of the wall had to do mostly with internal politics, that is, offering Antoninus an opportunity to gain some modicum of necessary military prestige at the start of his reign. Actually, the campaign in Britannia was followed by an Imperial salutation, that is, by Antoninus formally taking for the second (and last) time the title of Imperator in 142. The fact that around the same time coins were struck announcing a victory in Britain points to Antoninus' need to publicize his achievements. The orator Fronto was later to say that, although Antoninus bestowed the direction of the British campaign to others, he should be regarded as the helmsman who directed the voyage, whose glory, therefore, belonged to him.

That this quest for some military achievement responded to an actual need is proved by the fact that, although generally peaceful, Antoninus' reign was not free from attempts at usurpation: Historia Augusta mentions two, made by the senators Cornelius Priscianus ("for disturbing the peace of Spain"; Priscianus had also been Lollius Urbicus' successor as governor of Britain) and Atilius Rufius Titianus (possibly a troublemaker already exiled under Hadrian). Both attempts are confirmed by the Fasti Ostienses as well as by the erasing of Priscianus' name from an inscription. In both cases, Antoninus was not in formal charge of the ensuing repression: Priscianus committed suicide and Titianus was found guilty by the Senate, with Antoninus abstaining from sequestering their families' properties.

There were also some troubles in Dacia Inferior which required the granting of additional powers to the procurator governor and the dispatch of additional soldiers to the province. On the northern Black Sea coast, the Greek city of Olbia was held against the Scythians. Also during his reign the governor of Upper Germany, probably Caius Popillius Carus Pedo, built new fortifications in the Agri Decumates, advancing the Limes Germanicus fifteen miles forward in his province and neighboring Raetia. In the East, Roman suzerainty over Armenia was retained by the choice in AD 140 of Arsacid scion Sohaemus as client king.

Nevertheless, Antoninus was virtually unique among emperors in that he dealt with these crises without leaving Italy once during his reign, but instead dealt with provincial matters of war and peace through their governors or through imperial letters to the cities such as Ephesus (of which some were publicly displayed). This style of government was highly praised by his contemporaries and by later generations.

Antoninus was the last Roman Emperor recognised by the Indian Kingdoms, especially the Kushan Empire. Raoul McLaughlin quotes Aurelius Victor as saying "The Indians, the Bactrians, and the Hyrcanians all sent ambassadors to Antoninus. They had all heard about the spirit of justice held by this great emperor, justice that was heightened by his handsome and grave countenance, and his slim and vigorous figure." Due to the outbreak of the Antonine epidemic and wars against northern Germanic tribes, the reign of Marcus Aurelius was forced to alter the focus of foreign policies, and matters relating to the Far East were increasingly abandoned in favour of those directly concerning the Empire's survival.

Economy and administration 

Antoninus was regarded as a skilled administrator and as a builder. In spite of an extensive building directive—the free access of the people of Rome to drinking water was expanded with the construction of aqueducts, not only in Rome but throughout the Empire, as well as bridges and roads—the emperor still managed to leave behind a sizable public treasury of around 2.7 billion sesterces. Rome would not witness another Emperor leaving his successor with a surplus for a long time, but this treasury was depleted almost immediately after Antoninus's reign due to the Antonine Plague brought back by soldiers after the Parthian victory.

The Emperor also famously suspended the collection of taxes from cities affected by natural disasters, such as when fires struck Rome and Narbona, and earthquakes affected Rhodes and the Province of Asia. He offered hefty financial grants for rebuilding and recovery of various Greek cities after two serious earthquakes: the first, circa 140, which affected mostly Rhodes and other islands; the second, in 152, which hit Cyzicus (where the huge and newly built Temple to Hadrian was destroyed), Ephesus, and Smyrna. Antoninus' financial help earned him praise by Greek writers such as Aelius Aristides and Pausanias. These cities received from Antoninus the usual honorific accolades, such as when he commanded that all governors of Asia should enter the province, when taking office, by way of Ephesus. Ephesus was specially favoured by Antoninus, who confirmed and upheld its distinction of having two temples for the imperial cult (neocorate), therefore having first place in the list of imperial honor titles, surpassing both Smyrna and Pergamon.

In his dealings with Greek-speaking cities, Antoninus followed the policy adopted by Hadrian of ingratiating himself with local elites, especially with local intellectuals: philosophers, teachers of literature, rhetoricians and physicians were explicitly exempted from any duties involving private spending for civic purposes, a privilege granted by Hadrian that Antoninus confirmed by means of an edict preserved in the Digest (27.1.6.8). Antoninus also created a chair for the teaching of rhetoric in Athens.

Antoninus was known as an avid observer of rites of religion and of formal celebrations, both Roman and foreign. He is known for having increasingly formalized the official cult offered to the Great Mother, which from his reign onwards included a bull sacrifice, a taurobolium, formerly only a private ritual, now being also performed for the sake of the Emperor's welfare. Antoninus also offered patronage to the worship of Mithras, to whom he erected a temple in Ostia. In 148, he presided over the celebrations of the 900th anniversary of the founding of Rome.

Legal reforms 

Antoninus tried to portray himself as a magistrate of the res publica, no matter how extended and ill-defined his competencies were. He is credited with the splitting of the imperial treasury, the fiscus. This splitting had to do with the division of imperial properties into two parts. Firstly, the fiscus itself, or patrimonium, meaning the properties of the "Crown", the hereditary properties of each succeeding person that sat on the throne, transmitted to his successors in office, regardless of their previous membership in the imperial family. Secondly, the res privata, the "private" properties tied to the personal maintenance of the Emperor and his family, something like a Privy Purse. An anecdote in the Historia Augusta biography, where Antoninus replies to Faustina (who complained about his stinginess) that "we have gained an empire [and] lost even what we had before" possibly relates to Antoninus' actual concerns at the creation of the res privata. While still a private citizen, Antoninus had increased his personal fortune greatly by mean of various legacies, the consequence of his caring scrupulously for his relatives. Also, Antoninus left behind him a reputation for stinginess and was probably determined not to leave his personal property to be "swallowed up by the demands of the imperial throne".

The res privata lands could be sold and/or given away, while the patrimonium properties were regarded as public. It was a way of pretending that the Imperial function—and most properties attached to it—was a public one, formally subject to the authority of the Senate and the Roman people. That the distinction played no part in subsequent political history—that the personal power of the princeps absorbed his role as office-holder—proves that the autocratic logic of the imperial order had already subsumed the old republican institutions.

Of the public transactions of this period there is only the scantiest of information, but, to judge by what is extant, those twenty-two years were not remarkably eventful in comparison to those before and after the reign. However, Antoninus did take a great interest in the revision and practice of the law throughout the empire. One of his chief concerns was to having local communities conform their legal procedures to existing Roman norms: in a case concerning repression of banditry by local police officers ("irenarchs", Greek for "peace keepers") in Asia Minor, Antoninus ordered that these officers should not treat suspects as already condemned, and also keep a detailed copy of their interrogations, to be used in the possibility of an appeal to the Roman governor. Also, although Antoninus was not an innovator, he would not always follow the absolute letter of the law; rather he was driven by concerns over humanity and equality, and introduced into Roman law many important new principles based upon this notion.

In this, the emperor was assisted by five chief lawyers: Lucius Fulvius Aburnius Valens, an author of legal treatises; Lucius Ulpius Marcellus, a prolific writer; and three others. Of these three, the most prominent was Lucius Volusius Maecianus, a former military officer turned by Antoninus into a civil procurator, and who, in view of his subsequent career (discovered on the basis of epigraphical and prosopographical research), was the Emperor's most important legal adviser. Maecianus would eventually be chosen to occupy various prefectures (see below) as well as to conduct the legal studies of Marcus Aurelius. He was also the author of a large work on Fidei commissa (Testamentary Trusts). As a hallmark of the increased connection between jurists and the imperial government, Antoninus' reign also saw the appearance of the Institutes of Gaius, an elementary legal textbook for beginners.

Antoninus passed measures to facilitate the enfranchisement of slaves. Mostly, he favoured the principle of favor libertatis, giving the putative freedman the benefit of the doubt when the claim to freedom was not clearcut. Also, he punished the killing of a slave by his/her master without previous trial and determined that slaves could be forcibly sold to another master by a proconsul in cases of consistent mistreatment. Antoninus upheld the enforcement of contracts for selling of female slaves forbidding their further employment in prostitution. In criminal law, Antoninus introduced the important principle that accused persons are not to be treated as guilty before trial, as in the case of the irenarchs (see above). It was to Antoninus that the Christian apologist Justin Martyr addressed his defense of the Christian faith, reminding him of his father's (Emperor Hadrian's) rule that accusations against Christians required proof. Antoninus also asserted the principle that the trial was to be held, and the punishment inflicted, in the place where the crime had been committed. He mitigated the use of torture in examining slaves by certain limitations. Thus he prohibited the application of torture to children under fourteen years, though this rule had exceptions. However, it must be stressed that Antoninus extended, by means of a rescript, the use of torture as a means of obtaining evidence to pecuniary cases, when it had been applied up until then only in criminal cases. Also, already at the time torture of free men of low status (humiliores) had become legal, as proved by the fact that Antoninus exempted town councillors expressly from it, and also free men of high rank (honestiores) in general.

One highlight during his reign occurred in 148, with the nine-hundredth anniversary of the foundation of Rome being celebrated by the hosting of magnificent games in Rome. It lasted a number of days, and a host of exotic animals were killed, including elephants, giraffes, tigers, rhinoceroses, crocodiles and hippopotamuses. While this increased Antoninus's popularity, the frugal emperor had to debase the Roman currency. He decreased the silver purity of the denarius from 89% to 83.5, the actual silver weight dropping from 2.88 grams to 2.68 grams.

Scholars name Antoninus Pius as the leading candidate for an individual identified as a friend of Rabbi Judah the Prince. According to the Talmud (Avodah Zarah 10a–b), Rabbi Judah was very wealthy and greatly revered in Rome. He had a close friendship with "Antoninus", possibly Antoninus Pius, who would consult Rabbi Judah on various worldly and spiritual matters.

Diplomatic mission to China 

The first group of people claiming to be an ambassadorial mission of Romans to China was recorded in 166 AD by the Hou Hanshu. Harper (2017) states that the embassy was likely to be a group of merchants, as many Roman merchants traveled to India and some might have gone beyond, while there are no records of official ambassadors of Rome travelling as far east. The group came to Emperor Huan of Han China and claimed to be an embassy from "Andun" (for Anton-inus), "king of Daqin" (Rome). As Antoninus Pius died in 161, leaving the empire to his adoptive son Marcus Aurelius (Antoninus), and the envoy arrived in 166, confusion remains about who sent the mission, given that both Emperors were named "Antoninus". The Roman mission came from the south (therefore probably by sea), entering China by the frontier province of Jiaozhi at Rinan or Tonkin (present-day northern Vietnam). It brought presents of rhinoceros horns, ivory, and tortoise shell, probably acquired in South Asia. The text specifically states that it was the first time there had been direct contact between the two countries.

Furthermore, a piece of Republican-era Roman glassware has been found at a Western Han tomb in Guangzhou along the South China Sea, dated to the early 1st century BC. Roman golden medallions made during the reign of Antoninus Pius and perhaps even Marcus Aurelius have been found at Óc Eo in southern Vietnam, then part of the Kingdom of Funan near the Chinese province of Jiaozhi. This may have been the port city of Kattigara, described by Ptolemy (c. 150) as being visited by a Greek sailor named Alexander and lying beyond the Golden Chersonese (i.e., Malay Peninsula). Roman coins from the reigns of Tiberius to Aurelian have been discovered in Xi'an, China (site of the Han capital Chang'an), although the significantly greater amount of Roman coins unearthed in India suggest the Roman maritime trade for purchasing Chinese silk was centered there, not in China or even the overland Silk Road running through ancient Iran.

Death and legacy

In 156, Antoninus Pius turned 70. He found it difficult to keep himself upright without stays. He started nibbling on dry bread to give him the strength to stay awake through his morning receptions.

Marcus Aurelius had already been created consul with Antoninus in 140, receiving the title of Caesar, i.e., heir apparent. As Antoninus aged, Marcus took on more administrative duties. Marcus's administrative duties increased again after the death, in 156 or 157, of one of Antoninus' most trusted advisers, Marcus Gavius Maximus.

For twenty years, Gavius Maximus had been praetorian prefect, an office that was as much secretarial as military. Gavius Maximus had been awarded with the consular insignia and the honors due a senator. He had a reputation as a most strict disciplinarian (vir severissimus, according to Historia Augusta) and some fellow equestrian procurators held lasting grudges against him. A procurator named Gaius Censorius Niger died while Gavius Maximus was alive. In his will, Censorius Niger vilified Maximus, creating serious embarrassment for one of the heirs, the orator Fronto.

Gavius Maximus' death initiated a change in the ruling team. It has been speculated that it was the legal adviser Lucius Volusius Maecianus who assumed the role of grey eminence. Maecianus was briefly Praefect of Egypt, and subsequently Praefectus annonae in Rome. If it was Maecianus who rose to prominence, he may have risen precisely in order to prepare the incoming — and unprecedented — joint succession. In 160, Marcus and Lucius were designated joint consuls for the following year. Perhaps Antoninus was already ill; in any case, he died before the year was out, probably on 7 March.

He ate Alpine Gruyere cheese at dinner quite greedily. In the night he vomited; he had a fever the next day. The day after that, he summoned the imperial council, and passed the state and his daughter to Marcus. The emperor gave the keynote to his life in the last word that he uttered: when the tribune of the night-watch came to ask the password, he responded, "aequanimitas" (equanimity). He then turned over, as if going to sleep, and died. His death closed out the longest reign since Augustus (surpassing Tiberius by a couple of months). His record for the second-longest reign would be unbeaten for 168 years, until 329 when it was surpassed by Constantine the Great.

Antoninus Pius' funeral ceremonies were, in the words of the biographer, "elaborate". If his funeral followed the pattern of past funerals, his body would have been incinerated on a pyre at the Campus Martius, while his spirit would rise to the gods' home in the heavens. However, it seems that this was not the case: according to his Historia Augusta biography (which seems to reproduce an earlier, detailed report) Antoninus' body (and not his ashes) was buried in Hadrian's mausoleum. After a seven-day interval (justitium), Marcus and Lucius nominated their father for deification. In contrast to their behavior during Antoninus' campaign to deify Hadrian, the senate did not oppose the emperors' wishes. A flamen, or cultic priest, was appointed to minister the cult of the deified Antoninus, now Divus Antoninus.

A column was dedicated to Antoninus on the Campus Martius, and the temple he had built in the Forum in 141 to his deified wife Faustina was rededicated to the deified Faustina and the deified Antoninus. It survives as the church of San Lorenzo in Miranda.

Historiography 

The only intact account of his life handed down to us is that of the Augustan History, an unreliable and mostly fabricated work. Nevertheless, it still contains information that is considered reasonably sound, for instance, it is the only source that mentions the erection of the Antonine Wall in Britain. Antoninus is unique among Roman emperors in that he has no other biographies.

Antoninus in many ways was the ideal of the landed gentleman praised not only by ancient Romans, but also by later scholars of classical history, such as Edward Gibbon or the author of the article on Antoninus Pius in the Encyclopædia Britannica Eleventh Edition.

Some historians have a less positive view of his reign. According to the historian J. B. Bury,

German historian Ernst Kornemann has had it in his Römische Geschichte [2 vols., ed. by H. Bengtson, Stuttgart 1954] that the reign of Antoninus comprised "a succession of grossly wasted opportunities", given the upheavals that were to come. There is more to this argument, given that the Parthians in the East were themselves soon to make no small amount of mischief after Antoninus' death. Kornemann's brief is that Antoninus might have waged preventive wars to head off these outsiders. Michael Grant agrees that it is possible that had Antoninus acted decisively sooner (it appears that, on his death bed, he was preparing a large-scale action against the Parthians), the Parthians might have been unable to choose their own time, but current evidence is not conclusive. Grant opines that Antoninus and his officers did act in a resolute manner dealing with frontier disturbances of his time, although conditions for long-lasting peace were not created. On the whole, according to Grant, Marcus Aurelius' eulogistic picture of Antoninus seems deserved, and Antoninus appears to have been a conservative and nationalistic (although he respected and followed Hadrian's example of Philhellenism moderately) Emperor who was not tainted by the blood of either citizen or foe, combined and maintained Numa Pompilius' good fortune, pacific dutifulness and religious scrupulousness, and whose laws removed anomalies and softened harshnesses.

Krzysztof Ulanowski argues that the claims of military inability are exaggerated, considering that although the sources praise Antoninus' love for peace and his efforts "rather to defend, than enlarge the provinces", he could hardly be considered a pacifist, as shown by the conquest of the Lowlands, the building of the Antonine Wall and the expansion of Germania Superior. Ulanowski also praises Antoninus for being successful in deterrence by diplomatic means.

Descendants 
Although only one of his four children survived to adulthood, Antoninus came to be ancestor to four generations of prominent Romans, including the Emperor Commodus. Hans-Georg Pflaum has identified five direct descendants of Antoninus and Faustina who were consuls in the first half of the third century.
 Marcus Aurelius Fulvus Antoninus (died before 138), died young without issue
 Marcus Galerius Aurelius Antoninus (died before 138), died young without issue
 Aurelia Fadilla (died in 135), who married Lucius Plautius Lamia Silvanus, suffect consul in 145; no children known for certain.
 Annia Galeria Faustina the Younger (21 September between 125 and 130–175), had several children; those who had children were: 
 Annia Aurelia Galeria Lucilla (7 March 150–182?), whose children included:
 Tiberius Claudius Pompeianus
 Annia Galeria Aurelia Faustina (151–?), whose children included:
 Tiberius Claudius Severus Proculus
 Empress Annia Faustina, Elagabalus' third wife
 Annia Aurelia Fadilla (159–after 211)
 Annia Cornificia Faustina Minor (160–213)

References

Sources
Primary sources
 Cassius Dio, Roman History, Book 70, English translation
 Aurelius Victor, Epitome de Caesaribu", English translation
 Historia Augusta, The Life of Antoninus Pius, English translation. Note that the Historia Augusta includes pseudohistorical elements.

Secondary sources

 
 
 
 
 
 
 
  This source lists:
 Bossart-Mueller, Zur Geschichte des Kaisers A. (1868)
 Bryant, The Reign of Antonine (Cambridge Historical Essays, 1895)
 Lacour-Gayet, A. le Pieux et son Temps (1888)

External links

 
86 births
161 deaths
2nd-century Gallo-Roman people
2nd-century Roman emperors
Adult adoptees
Aelii
Ancient Roman adoptees
Arrii
Aurelii Fulvi
Burials at the Castel Sant'Angelo
Deified Roman emperors
Gaulish people
Imperial Roman consuls
Imperial Roman praetors
Nerva–Antonine dynasty
People from Gallia Narbonensis
People from Lanuvio
Roman governors of Asia
Roman quaestors
Roman pharaohs